Hemimyzon elongata is a species of ray-finned fish in the genus Hemimyzon. It has been found in the Mekong basin in Yunnan, China. It is a benthopelagic, freshwater fish.

References

 

elongata
Fish described in 1985